Yiliang County is a county, under the jurisdiction of Kunming, the capital of Yunnan province, China.

Administrative divisions
Kuangyuan Town (匡远镇)
Beigucheng Town (北古城镇)
Tangchi Town (汤池镇)
Goujie Town (狗街镇)
Gengjiaying Yi Nationality & Miao Nationality Village (耿家营彝族苗族乡)
Jiuxiang Yi Nationality & Hui Nationality Village (九乡彝族回族乡)
Majie Village (马街乡)
Zhushan Village (竹山乡)

Climate

References 

 Area Code and Postal Code in Yunnan Province

External links 

Yiliang County, Kunming Official Website

County-level divisions of Kunming